Ambrax (Ancient Greek: Άμβραξ) was a Greek mythological king of the city of Ambracia located in the region in Epirus in ancient Greece. He was king when the exiled Aeneas came to his city. He was son of Dexamenus that was in turn son of Hercules.

Note

References 

 Dionysus of Halicarnassus, Roman Antiquities. English translation by Earnest Cary in the Loeb Classical Library, 7 volumes. Harvard University Press, 1937-1950. Online version at Bill Thayer's Web Site
 Dionysius of Halicarnassus, Antiquitatum Romanarum quae supersunt, Vol I-IV. . Karl Jacoby. In Aedibus B.G. Teubneri. Leipzig. 1885. Greek text available at the Perseus Digital Library.

Epirotic mythology
Kings in Greek mythology